William John Greenstreet (1861–1930) was an English mathematician who was editor of The Mathematical Gazette for more than thirty years.

Life and work 
Greenstreet was son of a Royal Artillery's Sergeant. He was educated at Southwark and he entered St John's College, Cambridge in 1879, graduating there in 1883. Then he was mathematics professor in different schools in Framlingham, East Riding and Cardiff before he became Head Master at Marling School in 1891. In 1910 he retired to Burghfield Common with the intention of devoting to literary work.

Greenstreet was founding member of the Mathematical Association and he started the Association's Library given a large collection of books.

References

Bibliography

External links 
 

1861 births
1930 deaths
19th-century English mathematicians
20th-century English mathematicians
People from Folkestone
People from Burghfield